The following is a list of people executed by the U.S. state of Texas between 1850 and 1859. During this period 18 people were executed by hanging.

Executions 1850–1859

See also
 Capital punishment in the United States

References

1850
19th-century executions by Texas
1850s-related lists
1850s in Texas